The 1971 Paris–Nice was the 29th edition of the Paris–Nice cycle race and was held from 10 March to 17 March 1971. The race started in Paris and finished in Nice. The race was won by Eddy Merckx of the Molteni team.

General classification

References

1971
1971 in road cycling
1971 in French sport
March 1971 sports events in Europe
1971 Super Prestige Pernod